The Burgomeister is a 1935 Australian film directed by Harry Southwell based on the 1867 play Le juif polonais (aka The Bells) by Erckmann-Chatrian, adapted into English in 1871 by Leopold Lewis, previously filmed a number of times. The Burgomeister (1935) is considered a 'substantially lost' film, with only one sequence surviving.

Southwell had performed the play in Europe, and had previously filmed it in Belgium (1925) as Le juif polonais (The Bells). This silent film version was shown in Australia in 1928.

Cast
Harry Southwell as Mathias
Janet Ramsey Johnson as Annette	
Muriel Meredith as Catherine
Lily Molloy as Sozel
Stan Tolhurst as the Polish Jew
Gabriel Toyne	 as Fritz
Ross Vernon as Christian
Harold Meade as Father Walter
Bertie Wright as Heinrich
Leslie Victor as Hans
Judy Eccles as Baby Annette
Paul Furness as hypnotist
James Toohey as witness
Jane Munro as Marie
Alf Scarlett
Reginald Riddell

Production
Southwell wanted to make the 1935 remake for less than £4,000. He formed a production company in April 1935 called Film Players Corporation. Among its directors were Sir John Butters, a director of Associated Newspapers, and W.J. Bradley, K.C. and society figure George Rayner.

Production began in June 1935 at Cinesound's Bondi studios. It ended in July with a cost of £10,000.

The original music score was by Isador Goodman, and costumes by Barbara Robison. Rupert Kathner worked as art director.

The final scenes of the film were shot in the snow on Mount Kosciuszko. Cameraman George Heath worked under difficult conditions including freezing cold and a blizzard.

Release
During pre-production, RKO signed to distribute the movie in Australia and Britain. The film was refused registration under the quality clause of the New South Wales Film Quota Act.

It was previewed on 29 September 1935 but was not screened commercially. This caused the investors to lose their money, an event which was blamed for scaring Australian investors away from putting their money into local films.

A re-edited version of the film called Hypnotized screened in some country areas. In 1937 the move was released in the UK as Flames of Conscience.

See also
The Bells (Australia 1911)
The Bells (US 1918)
The Bells (US 1926)
The Bells (UK 1931)

References

External links
The Burgomeister at IMDb
 The Burgomeister at National Film and Sound Archive
The Burgomeister at Oz Movies
The Burgomeister at AustLit
Complete copy of original script at National Archives of Australia

Lost Australian films
Australian black-and-white films
Australian comedy films
1935 comedy films
Censorship in Australia
1935 lost films
Lost comedy films
1930s English-language films
Films directed by Harry Southwell